Cephalotomandra is a genus of flowering plants belonging to the family Nyctaginaceae.

Its native range is Central America to Colombia.

Species:

Cephalotomandra fragrans 
Cephalotomandra panamensis

References

Nyctaginaceae
Caryophyllales genera